The 2015 season was Molde's eight consecutive year in Tippeligaen, and their 39th season in the top flight of Norwegian football. It was their second season with Tor Ole Skullerud as their manager, and they were the defending champions of both the Tippeligaen and Norwegian Cup. Along with Tippeligaen, the club also competed in the Norwegian Cup, the UEFA Champions League and the UEFA Europa League.

Season events
Following the clubs elimination from the UEFA Champions League, manager Tor Ole Skullerud was sacked on 6 August, being replaced with Erling Moe on an interim basis. On 21 October 2015, Ole Gunnar Solskjær returned as manager, signing a 3.5 year contract.

Squad

Players on loan

Reserve squad

Transfers

In

Out

Loans in

Loans out

Friendlies

Competitions

Tippeligaen

Results summary

Results by round

Results

Table

Norwegian Cup

UEFA Champions League

Qualifying rounds

UEFA Europa League

Qualifying rounds

Group stage

On 28 August 2015, the draw for the group stage was made in Monaco. Molde faced Ajax, Celtic and Fenerbahçe in Group A. Molde topped the group with eleven points, and were drawn against Spanish football side Sevilla FC in the Round of 32.

Squad statistics

Appearances and goals

|-
|colspan="14"|Players away from Molde on loan:

|-
|colspan="14"|Players who appeared for Molde no longer at the club:

|}

Goal scorers

Disciplinary record

See also
Molde FK seasons

Notes
Strømsgodset versus Molde was postponed on 25 July 2015 due to both clubs participation in European competition the following week.

References

2015
Molde
Molde
Molde